Arthur Stanley Williams (1861 in Brighton – 21 November 1938) was an English solicitor and amateur astronomer. He dedicated himself to the telescopic observation of the planets. He also was enthusiastic about yachting, winning the Challenge Cup in 1920.

Planetary works
Using a 6½ inch reflector on an equatorial mount for most of his work, he published an influential paper in 1896: "On the Drift of Surface Material of Jupiter in Different Latitudes." With this work he greatly strengthened the efforts to systematically observe Jupiter. He also invented the naming of belts and zones in 1898. He championed the method of determining the longitude of surface features using their central meridian transit. 

In 1899 he published his most influential paper: "Periodic Variations in the Colours of the two Equatorial Belts of Jupiter."

He also observed spots on Saturn, and the "linear features" on Mars, called "canals". He agreed early on with E. M. Antoniadi that these were largely illusory.

Awards
He was made a fellow of the Royal Astronomical Society in 1884, and was awarded the Jackson-Gwilt Medal in 1923.

The crater Williams on the Moon and a crater on Mars are named in his honor.

References

External links

Obituaries
MNRAS 99 (1939) 313
JBAA 49 (1939) 359

19th-century British astronomers
1861 births
1938 deaths
20th-century British astronomers